Battle of Sufetula can refer to:
 Battle of Sufetula (546 or 547) between Byzantines and Moors
 Battle of Sufetula (647) between Byzantines and Arabs